Dane is both a surname and a given name. Notable people with the name include:

Surname
 Alexandra Dane (born 1946), South African actress
 Barbara Dane (born 1927), American singer
 Dana Dane (born 1965), American hip-hop artist
 Eric Dane (born 1972), American actor
 Francis Dane (1615-1697), minister in colonial Massachusetts during the Salem Witch Trials
 Hugh Dane (1942-2018), American actor 
 Jordan Dane (born 1953), American novelist
 Joseph Dane (1778-1858), American congressman from Maine
 Karl Dane (1886-1934), Danish-American silent film actor
 Lloyd Dane (1925-2015), American race car driver
 Maxwell Dane (1906-2004), American advertising executive
 Nathan Dane (1752–1835), American lawyer and statesman representing Massachusetts in the Continental Congress from 1785 to 1787
 Patricia Dane (1919-1995), American film actress
 Warrel Dane (1961–2017), American singer

Given name
 Dane Anderson (born 1984), Australian cricket player
 Dane Baptiste (born 1984), British stand-up comedian and writer
 Dane Beesley (born 1978), Australian photographer
 Dane Belton (born 1999), American football player
 Dane Bird-Smith (born 1992), Australian racewalking athlete
 Dane Blacker (born 1998), Welsh rugby union player
 Dane Boedigheimer (born 1978), American filmmaker, singer, and actor
 Dane Boswell (born 1984), New Zealand rower
 Dane Bowers (born 1979), British singer and member of 5th Story, formerly of Another Level
 Dane Byers (born 1986), Canadian professional ice hockey player
 Dane Cameron (born 1988), American racing driver
 Dane Campbell (born 1984), Australian rugby league administrator and former footballer
 Dane Carlaw (born 1980), Australian former professional rugby league footballer
 Dane Chanase (1894-1975), American painter and printmaker
 Dane Chisholm (born 1990), Australian Rugby League player
 Dane Clark (1912-1998), American character actor
 Dane Cleaver (born 1992), New Zealand first-class cricketer
 Dane Coles (born 1986), New Zealand rugby union player
 Dane Cook (born 1972), American stand-up comic and actor
 Dane Coolidge (1873-1940), American author, naturalist, and photographer
 Dane Cruikshank (born 1995), American football player
 Dane Currency (born 1985), Barbadian cricketer
 Dane Damron, American football coach and former player
 Dane Dastillung (1897–1982), American football player
 Dane Davis, American sound editor
 Dane De La Rosa (born 1983), American professional baseball player
 Dane DeHaan (born 1986), American actor
 Dane DiLiegro (born 1988), American actor, stuntman, and former professional basketball player
 Dane Dobbie (born 1986), Canadian professional lacrosse player
 Dane Dorahy (born 1977), Australian former professional rugby league footballer
 Dane Dukić (born 1981), Serbian former footballer
 Dane Dunning (born 1994), American professional baseball player
 Dane Eagle (born 1983), American politician
 Dane Elkins (born 1999), American professional racquetball player
 Dane Evans (born 1993), American professional Canadian football player
 Dane Fife (born 1979), American former college basketball player and current assistant coach
 Dane Fischer (born 1979), American basketball coach
 Dane Fletcher (born 1986), American former football player
 Dane Fox (born 1993), Canadian professional ice hockey player
 Dane Gagai (born 1991), Australian professional rugby league footballer
 Dane Haylett-Petty (born 1989), Australian retired rugby union footballer
 Dane Hogan (born 1989), Australian professional rugby league footballer
 Dane Hussey (born 1949), American weightlifter
 Dane Hutchinson (born 1986), New Zealand cricketer
 Dane Hyatt (born 1984), Jamaican sprinter
 Dane Ingham (born 1999), New Zealand professional footballer
 Dane Iorg (born 1950), American retired MLB player
 Dane Jackson (disambiguation), multiple people
 Dane Johnson (born 1963), American former professional baseball coach and former pitcher
 Dane Kelly (born 1991), Jamaican professional footballer
 Dane Korica (born 1945), Serbian retired long-distance runner
 Dane Krager (born 1979), American former football player
 Dane Kuprešanin (born 1966), Bosnian-Herzegovinian retired footballer
 Dane Laffrey, American scenic designer and costume designer
 Dane Lanken (born 1945), Canadian journalist and author
 Dane Lett (born 1990), New Zealand field hockey player
 Dane Lloyd (born 1991), Canadian politician
 Dane Looker (born 1976), American former football player
 Dane Lovett (born 1984), Australian artist
 Dane Lussier (1909-1959), American screenwriter
 Dane Manning (born 1989), English professional rugby league footballer
 Dane Massey (born 1988), Irish professional footballer
 Dane McDonald (born 1987), Australian rugby league player
 Dane A. Miller (–2015), American business executive
 Dane Milovanović (born 1989), Australian footballer
 Dane Morgan (born 1979), Australian former rugby league footballer
 Dane Murphy (born 1986), American retired soccer player
 Dane Murray (born 2003), Scottish professional footballer
 Dane Neller (born 1956), American businessman and entrepreneur
 Dane Nielsen (born 1985), Australian former professional rugby league footballer
 Dane O'Hara (born 1953), New Zealand former rugby league footballer
 Dane O'Neill, Irish jockey
 Dane Pereira (born 1985), Indian footballer
 Dane Rampe (born 1990), Australian rules footballer
 Dane Randolph (born 1986), American former football player
 Dane Rauschenberg (born 1976), American long-distance runner and author
 Dane Rawlins (born 1956), Irish dressage rider
 Dane Reynolds (born 1985), American professional surfer
 Dane Richards (born 1983), Jamaican former professional footballer
 Dane Rudhyar (1895-1985), French-born American author, modernist composer, and humanistic astrologer
 Dane Rumble (born 1982), New Zealand recording artist
 Dane Saintus (born 1987), American soccer player
 Dane Sampson (born 1986), Australian sports shooter
 Dane Sanzenbacher (born 1988), American former football player
 Dane Sardinha (born 1979), American former professional baseball catcher
 Dane Scarlett (born 2004), English professional footballer
 Dane Schadendorf (born 2002), Zimbabwean cricketer
 Dane Searls (1988-2011), Australian BMX rider
 Dane Sharp (disambiguation), multiple people
 Dane Sorensen (born 1955), New Zealand former rugby league footballer
 Dane Spencer (born 1977), American former ski racer
 Dane Stojanović, Serbian commander
 Dane Strother, American Democratic political strategist, media commentator, and former reporter
 Dane Suttle (born 1961), American former professional basketball player
 Dane Swan (born 1984), Australian AFL player
 Dane Sweeny (born 2001), Australian professional tennis player
 Dane Tilse (born 1985), Australian former professional rugby league footballer
 Dane Trbović (born 1986), Serbian footballer
 Dane Tudor (born 1989), Australian-American freeskier
 Dane van der Westhuyzen (born 1992), South African professional rugby union player
 Dane van Niekerk (born 1993), South African cricketer
 Dane Vilas (born 1985), South African cricketer
 Dane Waters (born 1964), political strategist, elephant protection advocate, writer, and direct democracy advocate
 Dane Weston (born 1973), Antiguan former cricketer
 Dane Whitehouse (born 1970), English former footballer
 Dane Witherspoon (1957-2014), American actor
 Dane Zajc (1929-2005), Slovenian poet and playwright
 Dane Zander, Australian rugby union player

Fictional characters
 Dane (Wildstorm), a fictional character from WildStorm Productions, now owned by DC Comics
 Dane of Elysium, the Wonder Man from DC Comics
 The Dane, a term for Prince Hamlet of Denmark, a character in Shakespeare's tragedy Hamlet
 Saint Dane, a character in the Pendragon series
 Dane O'Neill, a character in Colleen McCulloch's book The Thorn Birds

See also
Danes (surname)

English masculine given names
English-language masculine given names
English-language surnames
Circassian feminine given names
Ethnonymic surnames